Alan Spence (born 1947) is a Scottish writer and is Professor in Creative Writing at the University of Aberdeen, where he is also artistic director of the annual WORD Festival. He was born in Glasgow, educated at Allan Glen's School there, and much of his work is set in the city.

Spence is a poet and playwright, novelist and short-story writer, and has recently been commissioned by Scottish Opera to set words to a piece of music by Miriama Young.

His first work was the collection of short stories Its colours they are fine, first published in 1977. This was followed by two plays, Sailmaker in 1982 and Space Invaders in 1983. The novel The Magic Flute appeared in 1990 along with his first book of poetry Glasgow Zen. In 1991, another of his plays, Changed Days, was published before a brief hiatus.

He returned in 1996 with Stone Garden, another collection of short stories.

In 2006, The Pure Land, a historical novel set in Japan, was published by Canongate Books, and is based on the life of Thomas Blake Glover who is allegedly immortalized in the story of Madame Butterfly.

In 2022, Edinburgh Come All Ye, a collection of poetry, was published by Scotland Street Press. 

Alan Spence is a member of the Edinburgh Sri Chinmoy Centre and practises meditation.

Awards
 1996: named Scottish writer of the year.
 2017: named Edinburgh Makar.
 2018: Order of the Rising Sun.

Reviews
 Burns, John (1982), review of Glasgow Zen and Sailmaker, in Hearn, Sheila G. (ed.), Cencrastus No. 10, Autumn 1982, pp. 42 & 43,

References

External links
Website

Living people
Scottish scholars and academics
Devotees of Sri Chinmoy
1947 births
People educated at Allan Glen's School